Rajesh Sharma is an Indian actor who acts in Hindi and Bengali films.

Early life
He was born in Ludhiana, India and worked in Kolkata. There he started acting in a theatre group named 'Rangakarmi' in Kolkata. He is an alumnus of the National School of Drama, New Delhi passed out in year 1980. Rajesh Sharma has been married and divorced to Sudipta Chakraborty, a Bengali actress and is married to Sangeeta Sharma since 2011.

Career

Rajesh Sharma made his Bollywood debut with the 1996 Hindi movie, Maachis. After this, he started acting in Bengali films from early 2000s. in Maachis, Rajesh Sharma co-starred with Chandrachur Singh, Jimmy Shergill, Raj Zutshi, Tabu and Om Puri. In 2000, he made a comeback in Bengali-film titled, Paromitar Ek Din. It was written and directed by Aparna Sen. After acting in a few more Bengali films, he came back to Bollywood in 2005 with the film Parineeta. It was Vidya Balan's debut movie where she acted against Saif Ali Khan.

Rajesh Sharma works mainly in the Bollywood and Bengali Film Industries. Sharma has appeared in Hindi films such as Khosla Ka Ghosla, Ishqiya, No One Killed Jessica, Chillar Party, The Dirty Picture, Luv Shuv Tey Chicken Khurana, Special 26, B.A. Pass, Tanu Weds Manu Returns, Bajrangi Bhaijaan, Toilet: Ek Prem Katha “M. S. Dhoni: The Untold Story” and India's Most Wanted.

Filmography

Films

Web series

References

External links 
 

Living people
Male actors in Bengali cinema
Indian male film actors
Male actors in Hindi cinema
National School of Drama alumni
Male actors from Ludhiana
21st-century Indian male actors
1950 births